Elena Novikova (born January 14, 1984) is a Ukrainian road cyclist, who most recently rode for UCI Women's Team . She represented her nation at the 2007 UCI Road World Championships and 2009 UCI Road World Championships.

She lives in Italy. She won 15 mtb and road 24 hours races in the category solo. She won 2 times 24 hours road race in Le Mans in France. Novikova won 3 times hardest in Italy mtb 24 hours solo race of Finale Ligure. In 2015, she won a title of European Champion of mtb 24 hours solo races. In 2016, she finished the second hardest mtb stage race in the World, Ironbike. In October 2015 she made a Record of Gavia mountain going up and down 9 times during 19 hours.

Career

World records
On September 17, 2017, she achieved 11 world records during the successful attempt to overcome the previous 24-hour record. All these records are Indoor Track – Solo – Standard – Women 18–49.

Records are:
 6 Hours = 222.024 Km – 137.959 Miles
 12 Hours = 421.347 Km – 261.812 Miles
 24 Hours = 781.638 Km – 485.687 Miles
 100 Km = 2h 37' 35"
 200 Km = 5h 23' 30"
 300 Km = 8h 18' 13"
 500 Km = 14h 29' 59"
 100 Miles = 4h 18' 00"
 200 Miles = 8h 55' 13"
 300 Miles = 13h 57' 23"
 500 Miles = 24h 46' 26"

Personal life
Novikova is known in Chile for being the girlfriend, for a couple of months, of the Congressman Gaspar Rivas, whom he met during the War in Donbass.

References

External links
 

1984 births
Living people
Cyclists from Saint Petersburg
Ukrainian female cyclists